Brompton railway station was a railway station that served the community of Brompton,  north east of Northallerton in North Yorkshire, England. It was opened in 1854 and closed in 1965.

History
It was equipped with three sidings to the south of the level crossing: a weighbridge, a coal drop, and a private siding. The principal freight from the station was hay and clover. The level crossing is still in operation, though the station buildings were demolished in the early 2000s.

Passenger trains in 1906 amounted to six stopping trains either way.

The station was closed on 6 September 1965. It was the last intermediate station still in operation between Northallerton and Eaglescliffe (although  railway station reopened in 1996).

The railway is still in operation for passenger trains to and from Sunderland (Grand Central), and to and from Middlesbrough (TransPennine Express). The line is also used for freight trains between the northeast and the south.

1924 accident
Men were working on the line and crossings to replace worn out tracks and fittings. Unwittingly, the gauge at the crossover was too wide and the last four coaches of the train derailed, with some mounting the platform on the opposite side of the line.

References

Sources

Disused railway stations in North Yorkshire
Railway stations in Great Britain opened in 1854
Railway stations in Great Britain closed in 1965
Former North Eastern Railway (UK) stations
1854 establishments in England
Beeching closures in England